Carolyn Talcott (born June 14, 1941) is an American computer scientist known for work in formal reasoning, especially as it relates to computers, cryptanalysis and systems biology. She is currently the program director of the Symbolic Systems Biology group at SRI International.

She is currently the co-editor-in-chief of Higher-Order and Symbolic Computation. Talcott married John McCarthy (computer scientist) and had a son.

Early life and education
Carolyn was born to Howard Talcott and Harriet Louise Mitchell who were Presbyterians from Idaho.
Talcott earned a Ph.D. from Stanford University in 1985. Her dissertation, The Essence of RUM: A Theory of the Intensional and Extensional Aspects of LISP-Type Computation, was supervised by Solomon Feferman.

Awards and memberships
Talcott was named an SRI Fellow in 2011. She is a member of the Association for Computing Machinery and the Association for Symbolic Logic.

References

External links
 List of publications from DBLP

Living people
American women computer scientists
American computer scientists
Theoretical computer scientists
Systems biologists
University of Denver alumni
University of California, Berkeley alumni
Stanford University alumni
Stanford University faculty
1941 births
People from Caldwell, Idaho
SRI International people
21st-century American women